Stéphane Lucien Adam (born 14 May 1969) is a French former professional footballer who played as a striker.

Career
Born in Lille, Adam was a forward who played for hometown Lille OSC, US Orléans, Créteil, Amiens SC and Metz in the French league. While at Metz he played as a substitute in the final as they won the 1995–96 Coupe de la Ligue. He then joined Hearts in the Scottish Premier Division where notably he scored the second goal in their 2–1 victory over Rangers in the 1998 Scottish Cup Final. Adam made a total of 145 appearances and scored 33 goals for Hearts.

After retiring in 2002 he became a coach, previously with Kilmarnock and later with Lille OSC.

References

External links

1969 births
Living people
Footballers from Lille
Association football forwards
French footballers
French expatriate footballers
Lille OSC players
Louhans-Cuiseaux FC players
US Créteil-Lusitanos players
Amiens SC players
FC Metz players
Ligue 1 players
Ligue 2 players
Heart of Midlothian F.C. players
Scottish Football League players
Scottish Premier League players
Expatriate footballers in Scotland
Lille OSC non-playing staff
Kilmarnock F.C. non-playing staff
French expatriate sportspeople in Scotland
Association football coaches